Azriel Rosenfeld (February 19, 1931 – February 22, 2004) was an American Research Professor, a Distinguished University Professor, and Director of the Center for Automation Research at the University of Maryland, College Park, Maryland, where he also held affiliate professorships in the Departments of Computer Science, Electrical Engineering, and Psychology, and a talmid chochom.  He held a Ph.D. in mathematics from Columbia University (1957), rabbinic ordination (1952) and a Doctor of Hebrew Literature degree (1955) from Yeshiva University, honorary Doctor of Technology degrees from Linkoping University (1980) and Oulu University (1994), and an honorary Doctor of Humane Letters degree from Yeshiva University (2000); he was awarded an honorary Doctor of Science degree from the Technion (2004, conferred posthumously). He was a Fellow of the Association for Computing Machinery (1994).

Rosenfeld was a leading researcher in the field of computer image analysis.  Over a period of nearly 40 years he made many fundamental and pioneering contributions to nearly every area of that field.  He wrote the first textbook in the field (1969); was founding editor of its first journal, Computer Graphics and Image Processing (1972); and was co-chairman of its first international conference (1987).  He published over 30 books and over 600 book chapters and journal articles, and directed nearly 60 Ph.D. dissertations.

Rosenfeld's research on digital image analysis (specifically on digital geometry and digital topology, and on the accurate measurement of statistical features of digital images) in the 1960s and 1970s formed the foundation for a generation of industrial vision inspection systems that have found widespread applications from the automotive to the electronics industry.

Rosenfeld was a ba'al koreh (Torah Reader) at Young Israel Shomrai Emunah of Greater Washington for many years until he moved to Baltimore in 2001.

In honor of the memory of Rosenfeld, ICCV gives the biennial Azriel Rosenfeld Award to a living person in the recognition of an outstanding life-time contribution to the field of image understanding or computer vision.

References

Lectures 

 1992 - Perspectives on computer vision Lecture sponsored by the Dept. of Electrical and Computer engineering, University of California, San Diego. Electrical and Computer Engineering Distinguished Lecture Series. Digital Object Made Available by Special Collections & Archives, UC San Diego.

External links
  History page of CS Dep at UoM
  PhD students of Azriel Rosenfeld
 Nagao: In memory of Prof. A. Rosenfeld
 Cantoni and Levialdi: Azriel Rosenfeld and the genesis of modern image systems
 Pavlidis: Discrete geometry and Azriel Rosenfeld
 1994 Harry H. Goode Memorial Award Recipient Azriel Rosenfeld
 (IJCV) Davis: In memory of Azriel Rosenfeld
 Elsevier's biography for Azriel Rosenfeld
 In memory of Rabbi Dr. Azriel Rosenfeld
 (IEEE PAMI) Chellappa and Kriegman: In memoriam, Azriel Rosenfeld (1931-2004)
 Books by Azriel Rosenfeld
 Workshop on "Computer Vision and Image Analysis To Commemorate Azriel Rosenfeld's Career"
 Advances in image understanding: a festschrift for Azriel Rosenfeld
 Memorial service Azriel Rosenfeld
 Images for Azriel Rosenfeld
 IAPR condolences
 CFAR condolences

Computer vision researchers
Digital geometry
20th-century American Jews
Fellows of the Association for Computing Machinery
1931 births
2004 deaths
Fellows of the International Association for Pattern Recognition
University of Maryland, College Park faculty
21st-century American Jews